Calicoan is a Philippine island east of Leyte Gulf, off the southeastern point of Samar. It is one of the islands that are part of the municipality of Guiuan, in the province of Eastern Samar. The island can be reached from Tacloban City by a three-hour bus ride.

Calicoan Island has white sand beaches with rocky bottoms. In the middle of the island are six lagoons ringed by forest, the largest being  in size. At the cliff side margin of Calicoan's forests are dozens of caves. On the northern tip of Calicoan are wetlands, teeming with fish, shrimp, and crabs.

The rich diversity of the area is evident when one sees the exotic species being sold. The surrounding waters support several marine-based industries such as fish farming, seaweed farming, and pearl farming.

During the landfall of Typhoon Haiyan (Super Typhoon Yolanda) in 8 November 2013, large sections of the eastern coast of the island were seriously damaged.

During World War II, the island was part of a large U.S. Navy base, the Leyte-Samar Naval Base.

External links
 Eastern Samar Website

Islands of Eastern Samar
Guiuan